Kelvin Humenny (born March 3, 1968) is a Canadian art director.

Filmography
Tomorrowland (2015)
Dawn of the Planet of the Apes (2014)
Charlie St. Cloud (2010)
Hot Tub Time Machine (2010)
Wind Chill (2007)
The Sisterhood of the Traveling Pants (2005)
Are We Done Yet? (2004)
Elf (2003)
My Boss's Daughter (2003)
Agent Cody Banks (2003)
Hope Springs (2003)
Josie and the Pussycats (2001)
The Duke (199)

References

External links

1968 births
Living people
Canadian art directors